The 2012–13 Rugby Pro D2 is the second-level French rugby union club competition, behind the Top 14, for the 2012–13 season. It ran alongside the 2012–13 Top 14 competition; both competitions are operated by the Ligue Nationale de Rugby (LNR).

Teams

Changes in the lineup from 2011–12 were:
 FC Grenoble won the 2011–12 Pro D2 title and were thereby automatically promoted to the Top 14. Mont-de-Marsan won the promotion playoffs to secure the second promotion place.
 The bottom finisher in 2011–12, Périgueux, was relegated from Pro D2 to Fédérale 1. Second-from-bottom Béziers were spared relegation when ninth-placed Bourgoin were forcibly relegated to Fédérale 1 for financial reasons.
 The two bottom finishers in the Top 14 in 2011-12, Brive and Lyon, were relegated to Pro D2.
 The two finalists in Fédérale 1, champion Massy and runner-up Colomiers, earned promotion.

Competition format
The top team at the end of the regular season (after all the teams played one another twice, once at home, once away), is declared champion and earns a spot in the next Top 14 season. Teams ranked second to fifth compete in promotion playoffs, with the semifinals being played at the home ground of the higher-ranked team. The final is then played on neutral ground, and the winner earned the second ticket to the next Top 14.

The LNR uses a slightly different bonus points system from that used in most other rugby competitions. It trialled a new system in 2007–08 explicitly designed to prevent a losing team from earning more than one bonus point in a match, a system that also made it impossible for either team to earn a bonus point in a drawn match. LNR chose to continue with this system for subsequent seasons.

France's bonus point system operates as follows:

 4 points for a win.
 2 points for a draw.
 1 "bonus" point for winning while scoring at least 3 more tries than the opponent. This replaces the standard bonus point for scoring 4 tries regardless of the match result.
 1 "bonus" point for losing by 7 points (or less).

Table

Relegation
Normally, the teams that finish in 15th and 16th places in the table are relegated to Fédérale 1 at the end of the season.  However, 7th placed Carcassonne were under threat of demotion due to "financial reasons".  Carcassonne appealed this decision and their appeal was successful.  Consequently, Pays d'Aix were demoted along with Massy.

Play–offs

Semi–finals
The semi–finals follow a 2 v 5, 3 v 4 system - with the higher ranked team playing at home.

Final

See also
 2012–13 Top 14 season

References

External links
  Ligue Nationale de Rugby – Official website
  Midi Olympique

2012–13
Pro D2